The 2014 Moselle Open was a men's tennis tournament held in Metz, France and played on indoor hard courts. It was the 12th edition of the Moselle Open, and part of the ATP World Tour 250 series of the 2014 ATP World Tour. It was held at the Parc des Expositions de Metz Métropole from 15 September until 21 September 2014. Eighth-seeded David Goffin won the singles title.

Singles main-draw entrants

Seeds

 1 Rankings are as of September 8, 2014.

Other entrants 
The following players received wild cards into the singles main draw:
  Laurent Lokoli
  Nicolas Mahut
  Paul-Henri Mathieu

The following players received entry from the singles qualifying draw:
  Kenny de Schepper
  Pierre-Hugues Herbert
  Michał Przysiężny
  Florent Serra

Withdrawals
Before the tournament
  Andrey Golubev
  Marcel Granollers
  Mikhail Kukushkin
  Leonardo Mayer
  Gilles Simon (right wrist injury)
  Dmitry Tursunov
  Stan Wawrinka (fatigue)

Retirements
  Philipp Kohlschreiber
  Andreas Seppi (back injury)

Doubles main-draw entrants

Seeds 

 Rankings are as of September 8, 2014

Other entrants 
The following pairs received wildcards into the doubles main draw:
  Jonathan Eysseric /  Adrian Mannarino
  Marc Gicquel /  Pierre-Hugues Herbert
The following pairs received entry as alternates:
  Sergiy Bubka /  Sergiy Stakhovsky
  Frank Moser /  Alexander Satschko

Withdrawals 
Before the tournament
  Édouard Roger-Vasselin (right hip injury)
  Andreas Seppi (back injury)

Finals

Singles 

 David Goffin defeated  João Sousa 6–4, 6–3

Doubles 

  Mariusz Fyrstenberg /  Marcin Matkowski defeated  Marin Draganja /  Henri Kontinen, 6–7(3–7), 6–3, [10–8]

External links
Official website